Matti Luoma-aho (26 December 1885 - 27 December 1943) was a Finnish farmer and politician, born in  Alajärvi. He was a member of the Parliament of Finland from 1939 until his death in 1943, representing the Agrarian League.

References

1885 births
1943 deaths
People from Alajärvi
People from Vaasa Province (Grand Duchy of Finland)
Finnish Lutherans
Centre Party (Finland) politicians
Members of the Parliament of Finland (1939–45)
Finnish people of World War II
20th-century Lutherans